The Uncanoonuc Mountains are two small mountain peaks in Goffstown, New Hampshire, United States.

The name may be derived from the Massachusett language term .

The area was developed in the early 1900s as a resort with a hotel and incline railway. The mountains are still a good spot for hiking, snowshoeing, and scenic views of the nearby skyline of Manchester and even, on a clear day, the faint skyline of Boston.

They were the site of a small ski operation in the 1930s and 1940s, served by the incline railway that went up the south peak. With three main trails from top to bottom, it was a popular ski destination until 1941, when the railway was damaged by a fire.

A new development was planned in the 1960s for the north peak, commencing in 1963. Chairlift and snow making equipment was ordered, several trails were cleared, but the project was halted by the town of Goffstown because of environmental concerns. In response to the failure, the city of Manchester opened its own area, McIntyre, in 1971.

The south peak contains transmitting facilities for many of the broadcast stations, including WMUR-TV, serving the Manchester area.

References

External links

Mountains of New Hampshire
Mountains of Hillsborough County, New Hampshire
New Hampshire placenames of Native American origin